Lincoln Rock State Park is a public recreation area on the east side of the Columbia River's Lake Entiat,  north of Wenatchee and one mile upstream from the Rocky Reach Dam.  The state park covers  opposite the cliff formation for which it is named. The park provides views of the south end of Swakane Canyon and of Turtle Rock Island in Lake Entiat, a 150-acre nature preserve that was isolated from the mainland when the lake formed in the 1960s. The park offers water activities, including fishing, boating, and swimming, in addition to facilities for picnicking, camping, hiking, and field sports. It is managed by the Washington State Parks and Recreation Commission under a lease agreement with the owners, the Chelan County Public Utility District.

References

External links

Lincoln Rock State Park Washington State Parks and Recreation Commission 
Lincoln Rock State Park Map Washington State Parks and Recreation Commission 

State parks of Washington (state)
Parks in Chelan County, Washington
Protected areas established in 1981